Penelope Stewart is a Toronto-based multi-disciplinary artist whose work encompasses installation, sculpture, photography and paper-based projects.

Biography
Stewart was born in Montreal. She obtained a Bachelor of Fine Arts from York University, Toronto and a Master of Fine Arts from the State University of New York at Buffalo.

Artistic career
Stewart is known for her installation work that often examines themes such as architecture, volume and space.

In February 2013, Stewart was the Artist in Residence at Ganna Walska Lotusland in Montecito, California. While there, her exhibition Swarm showcased architectural wall coverings made entirely from bees wax. She used the medium once more in 2014's Vanitas.

Major exhibits
Canopy, Stride Gallery, Calgary, Alberta - January 14 to February 12, 2005 Ou
Outside the Walls, Musée d'art de Joliette, Joliette, Quebec - July 4, 2009 to August 2, 2009
Vanitas, Koffler Galleries, Toronto, Ontario - June 26 to August 31, 2014

References

Living people
Anglophone Quebec people
Artists from Montreal
York University alumni
University at Buffalo alumni
Canadian installation artists
Women installation artists
21st-century Canadian women artists
Year of birth missing (living people)